Haadsaa  is a 1983 Hindi action thriller film directed and produced by Akbar Khan. The film stars Akbar Khan, Ranjeeta, Smita Patil, Naseeruddin Shah, Amrish Puri as main characters. The music was composed by Kalyanji-Anandji.

Story

Asha lives a poor lifestyle with her parents in Bombay. When her mother passes away, her dad turns to alcohol in a big way, and also brings home her stepmother, who is also an alcoholic and dislikes Asha. When Asha befriends Guddu, she throws him out of the house. In anger, Asha pushes her down the stairs and kills her. When she grows up, her father sells her to R.K. Chakravarty for a suitcase full of cash. Chakravarty marries her, but she remains frustrated, as he is impotent, incapable of loving her. Then she gets a parrot as a pet. When the parrot attempts to fly away, she clips its wings. When her car breaks down, she has it serviced at Auto Services, and when motor mechanic, Jaikumar Sharma, returns it to her house, she thinks her friend Guddu has returned, seduces and has sex with Jai. She frequently breaks her car down, and asks Jai to repair it, but he refuses to go along with her seductions. When she finds out that he has fallen in love with a girl named Robby, she decides to do away with her - and whoever else  attempts to stand in her and Jai's way.

Cast
 Ashok Kumar as Dr. Ved Kapoor
 Akbar Khan as Jai Kumar Sharma
 Ranjeeta as Robby Kapoor
 Smita Patil as Asha
 Naseeruddin Shah as Gangster
 Amrish Puri as R. K. Chakravarty
 Helen as Martha
 Jalal Agha as Lorry Driver
 Bob Christo as Robby's Abductor
 Iftekhar as Police Inspector
 Jagdeep as Anthony Gonsalves
 Mac Mohan as Gangster's Goon
 Master Ravi as Guddu 
 Rahul Dev as Bakhtavar
 Akash Khurana as Bade Miyan

Music

References

External links

1980s Hindi-language films
1983 films
Films scored by Kalyanji Anandji